The keeled plated lizard (Gerrhosaurus multilineatus) is a species of lizard in the Gerrhosauridae family.
It is found in Angola, Democratic Republic of the Congo, Zambia, Namibia, and Botswana.

References

Gerrhosaurus
Reptiles described in 1866
Taxa named by José Vicente Barbosa du Bocage